The following is a list of notable people who were born, raised, or closely associated with the Hampton Roads metropolitan area.

Chesapeake
 James Anderson – Carolina Panthers linebacker and 88th overall pick in the 2006 NFL Draft
Ed Beard (b. 1939) – professional football player for the San Francisco 49ers
Dré Bly (b. 1977) – professional football player with the Denver Broncos
Randy Blythe (b. 1971) – vocalist and lyricist for groove metal band Lamb of God
Michael Copon (b. 1982) – star of One Tree Hill and winner of VH1's But Can They Sing?
Chris Crocker (b. 1980) – professional football player with the Atlanta Falcons
Michael Cuddyer (b. 1979) – professional baseball right fielder for the New York Mets
Ras-I Dowling – New England Patriots cornerback 2011–present
Deon Dyer – Miami Dolphins running back 2003–2004
Kenny Easley (b. 1959) – professional football player with the Seattle Seahawks and Pro-Football Hall of Fame Member
Jeff Falk – NASCAR driver
DeAngelo Hall (b. 1983) – professional football cornerback for the Washington Redskins
Grant Holloway (b. 1997) - from Chesapeake (Grassfield Highschool) and University of Florida; won silver in the 2020 Olympics 
The Last Bison – indie folk group
Ashton Lewis (b. 1972) – NASCAR driver
Alonzo Mourning (b. 1970) – professional basketball player for the Miami Heat
Darren Perry (b. 1968) – football player with the Pittsburgh Steelers
Jay Pharoah (b. 1987) – actor, comedian, cast member of Saturday Night Live
Chris Richardson (b. 1984) – American Idol season 5 top 5 finalist
Ricky Rudd (b. 1956) – professional NASCAR race car driver
Josh Rupe (b. 1982) – professional baseball pitcher for the Texas Rangers
Elton Sawyer (b. 1959) – NASCAR driver
Donald Spitz Controversial Christian anti-abortion activist
Eric Stanley (b. 1991) – violinist and composer
Darryl Tapp  – Seattle Seahawks player and 63rd pick overall in the 2006 NFL Draft
B. J. Upton (b. 1984) – professional baseball shortstop for the Tampa Bay Rays; drafted #2 overall in 2002
Justin Upton (b. 1987) – professional baseball player drafted #1 overall in 2005 by the Arizona Diamondbacks
Adrienne Warren (b. 1987) – professional singer, actress and dancer. Portrays Lorrell Robinson in the 2010 National Tour of Dreamgirls; singer for Trans-Siberian Orchestra
David Wright (b. 1982) – professional baseball starting third baseman for the New York Mets

Hampton
Xavier Adibi – linebacker with the Houston Texans
Robert Banks – NFL defensive end
Nick Bodale (b. 2002) – local legend, former model, musician, and martial artist best known for his role as Rocky DeSantos in Mighty Morphin Power Rangers and Power Rangers Zeo
Macey Brooks – wide receiver for the Dallas Cowboys and Chicago Bears
Elton Brown (b. 1982) – former professional football player for the Arizona Cardinals
Ronald Curry (b. 1979) – professional football player for the Oakland Raiders
DRAM (b. 1988) – musician
Steve Earle (b. 1955) – popular country-rock musician and songwriter
Chris Ellis –  practice team member for the Pittsburgh Steelers
La'Keshia Frett – professional basketball player and coach
Shaun Gayle (b. 1962) – professional football player with the San Diego Chargers
Chris Hanburger (b. 1941) – popular Washington Redskins player in the 1970s
Dwight Hollier (b. 1969) – professional football player with the Miami Dolphins and the Indianapolis Colts
Mike Husted (b. 1970) – former kicker for the Tampa Bay Buccaneers, Oakland Raiders, and Washington Redskins
Weldon Irvine (1943–2002) – musician
Allen Iverson (b. 1975) – former professional basketball player
John P. Jumper (b. 1945) – former Chief of Staff of the US Air Force 
Jerod Mayo (b. 1986) – professional football player with the New England Patriots drafted 10th overall in 2008
Francena McCorory (b. 1988) – member of 2012 gold medal Olympic women's 4x400 team  
Dwight Stephenson (b. 1957) – professional football player for the Miami Dolphins and member of the Pro Football Hall of Fame
Tyrod Taylor (b.1989) – NFL quarterback for the New York Giants
Dwight White (1949–2008) – defensive end on the Pittsburgh Steelers during their 1970s glory years
Jimmy F. Williams (b. 1984) – professional football player with the Atlanta Falcons
Steve Wilson – jazz musician, alto and soprano saxophones, flute; composer
Antwoine Womack – drafted by New England Patriots in 2002
Roy "Future Man" Wooten (b. 1957) – musician

Newport News
Willie Armstead (b. 1952) – former professional football player in the Canadian Football League
Keith Atherton (b. 1959) - former pitcher for the Minnesota Twins and the Oakland Athletics.
Pearl Bailey (1918–1990) – Tony Award-winning actress and singer
Antoine Bethea (b. 1984) – professional football strong safety for the San Francisco 49ers
Larry Bethea (1956–1987) – late professional football player for the Dallas Cowboys
Darryl Blackstock (b. 1983) – professional football player for the Cincinnati Bengals
Blind Blake (1896–1934) – blues and ragtime musician (not officially confirmed he was born in Newport News)
John Ian Bobbitt (b. 1984) - Photorealistic Artist with contributions to Film, Music, Custom Automotive Art, and Tattoo Culture
Percy “Bud” Bobbitt (1927-2019) - Aeronautical Engineer & Admin. for NACA and NASA; primary contributor to the development of supersonic flight 
Aaron Brooks (b. 1976) – former professional football quarterback for the Oakland Raiders; land developer
Joyce Bulifant (b. 1937) – television actress
Robert Cray (b. 1953) – blues guitarist
Will Crutchfield (b. 1957) – opera conductor
Scott Darling (b. 1988) – professional ice hockey goaltender for the Carolina Hurricanes
Ben Edwards (b. 1992) – American football player
Frankie Faison (b. 1949) – film actor
Ella Fitzgerald (1917–1996) – jazz singer
The Five Keys – popular soul and doo-wop act in the 1950s; featuring Newport News locals Ripley Ingram, Bernie West, Dickie Threat and Rudy West 
Johnny Gilbert (b. 1928) – announcer for the television quiz show Jeopardy!
Marques Hagans (b. 1982) – NFL player
Henry Jordan (1935–1977) – former professional football player for the Green Bay Packers; member of the Pro Football Hall of Fame
Richard Kelly (b. 1975) – film director and writer; films include Donnie Darko and Domino
Leroy Keyes (1947–2021) – professional football running back for the Philadelphia Eagles
J. J. Lankes (1884–1960) – woodcut artist, lived for many years in the Hilton Village neighborhood
Kwamie Lassiter (b. 1969) – former football safety for the Arizona Cardinals
David Macklin (b. 1978) – professional football player for the Washington Redskins
Michael Maguire (b. 1955) – Tony Award-winning actor
Queen Esther Marrow (b. 1941) – soul and gospel singer
Masego (musician) (b. 1993) – R&B and traphouse jazz artist
Lightfoot Solomon Michaux (1885–1969) – evangelist, early radio and television pioneer
J. Clyde Morris (1909-1987) – first executive director of the Chesapeake Bay Bridge–Tunnel; former city manager of the City of Warwick
Hazel R. O'Leary (b. 1937) – former Secretary of Energy under President Bill Clinton and President of Fisk University
Tommy Reamon (b. 1952) – former pro football player and coach
Austin Roberts (b. 1945) – singer and songwriter
Norm Snead (b. 1939) – former professional football quarterback for the Philadelphia Eagles
Sonja Sohn (b. 1964) – actress, The Wire, Body of Proof
Jon St. John (b. 1960) – voice actor and singer, best known as the voice of Duke Nukem
William Styron (1925–2006) – author of The Confessions of Nat Turner and Sophie's Choice
Nick "The Goat" Thompson (b. 1981) – professional mixed martial arts fighter; Bodog Fight Welterweight Champion
Mike Tomlin (b. 1972) – head coach of the Pittsburgh Steelers
Al Toon (b. 1963) – former professional football player for the New York Jets
Marcus Vick (b. 1984) – former NFL player, quarterback for Virginia Tech
Michael Vick (b. 1980) – NFL quarterback, Philadelphia Eagles
Victor Wooten (b. 1964) – musician

Norfolk

Adam Anderson – driver of the Taz and Grave Digger Monster Trucks, and son of Monster Truck driver
Dennis Anderson – driver of the Grave Digger Monster Truck in the Monster Jam series 
Mason Andrews (1919–2006) – physician who delivered America's first in vitro baby; visionary leader of Norfolk's late 20th century renaissance
Anhayla (b. 1988) – singer-songwriter
Gordon Banks (b. 1955) – guitarist and music director for Marvin Gaye
Al Barks (b. 1936) – Negro league baseball player
Benny Blanco (b. 1988) – record producer, DJ, songwriter, and record executive
Gary "U.S." Bonds (b. 1939) – singer-songwriter
Plaxico Burress (b. 1977) – professional football wide receiver for the New York Jets
William Harvey Carney (1840–1908) – African-American soldier of the American Civil War; Medal of Honor recipient for his part in the 54th Massachusetts Infantry's assault on Fort Wagner, South Carolina
Kam Chancellor (b. 1988) – professional football safety for the Seattle Seahawks
Clarence Clemons – saxophonist for Bruce Springsteen's E Street Band
Alex Cosmidis – Minor League baseball player and manager and Major League scout
William Couper (1853–1942) – sculptor
Colgate Whitehead Darden, Jr. (1897–1981) – U.S. Representative; Governor of Virginia; Chancellor of the College of William and Mary; third President of the University of Virginia
Mike D'Orso (b. 1953) – author, journalist
Charles "Lefty" Driesell (b. 1931) – basketball coach at Davidson College, the University of Maryland, College Park, James Madison University, and Georgia State University
Rob Estes (b. 1963) – actor
Samuel Face (1923–2001) – inventor
Ryan Farish (b. 1974) – music composer, artist, publisher, and record executive of Rytone Entertainment
Florian-Ayala Fauna – artist musician
Hank Foiles, from Norfolk, Major league All-Star in 1957; played for seven teams; finished his career in 1964 with the expansion Los Angeles Angels
William Fuller (b. 1962) – professional football defensive end for the Houston Oilers, Philadelphia Eagles and Chicago Bears
Stephen Furst (1954–2017) – television actor
Grant Gustin (b. 1990) – television actor
Henry Howell (1920–97) – Independent Lieutenant Governor of Virginia
Lawrence "LoJo" Johnson (b. 1974) – Olympic pole vaulter, silver medalist in 2000
General Norman Johnson (b. 1943) – R&B musician
Kishi Bashi (b. 1975) – indie rock violinist; solo musician; tour member of Of Montreal and Regina Spektor
Naomi Long Madgett (b. 1923) – poet
Mae – indie rock band
Thomas W. Moss, Jr. (b. 1928) – Democratic Speaker of the Virginia House of Delegates, 1992–2000
Wayne Newton (b. 1942) – aka "Mr. Las Vegas"; singer and songwriter
Tim Reid (b. 1944) – television actor, director, and film executive
Jodi Rell (b. 1946) – Republican Governor of Connecticut, 2004–2011
Joseph Jenkins Roberts (1809–1876) – first President of Liberia
Dave Robertson (1889–1970) – from Norfolk, two-time National League home run leader; hit .500 in 1917 World Series. He hit .287 over nine seasons with the Giants, Cubs and Pirates. A product of Norfolk Academy, he played four sports at Wake Forest and N.C. State and managed the minor league Norfolk Tars for several years in the 1920s.
Larry Sabato (b. 1952) – political pundit and professor at the University of Virginia
Ed Schultz (1954–2018) – pundit and TV personality for MSNBC
Deborah Shelton (b. 1948) – actress; Miss USA 1970, first runner-up in Miss Universe contest
John Wesley Shipp (b. 1956) – television actor
Bruce Smith (b. 1963) – Pro Football Hall of Fame player for the Buffalo Bills and Washington Redskins
Joe Smith (b. 1975) – professional basketball player for the Philadelphia 76ers
Keely Smith (b. 1932) – nightclub singer, wife and stage partner of Louis Prima
Margaret Sullavan (1909–1960) – actress and wife of Leland Hayward
Chuck Swirsky – Chicago Bulls radio play-by-play announcer, previously with Toronto Raptors
Littleton Waller Tazewell (1774–1860) – U.S. Representative, U.S. Senator and Governor of Virginia
Antoine Thompson – cornerback with the St. Louis Rams
Scott Travis (b. 1961) – drummer for rock band Judas Priest
John Paul Vann (1924–1972) – U.S. soldier and civilian active in Vietnam
Marc Vann (b. 1954) – actor
Brandon Vera (b. 1977) – mixed martial artist, currently signed to UFC
Gene Vincent (1935–1971) – rock-a-billy artist recorded the hit "Be-Bop-a-Lula"
Ben Watson (b. 1980) – football player for the New England Patriots
Ernie Watts (b. 1945) – composer, jazz saxophonist, and long-time touring member of The Rolling Stones
Joe Weatherly (1922–1964) – NASCAR driver
Pernell "Sweet Pea" Whitaker (b. 1964) – boxer; 1984 Olympic gold medalist, professional champion in four weight classes
 Thomas Wilkins (b. 1954) – orchestra conductor, music director of the Omaha Symphony Orchestra
Patrick Wilson (b. 1973) – actor
David Wright (b. 1982) – professional baseball player for the New York Mets

Portsmouth
V. C. Andrews (1923–1986) – mystery and horror writer
Marty Brennaman (b. 1942) – sportscaster for the Cincinnati Reds
Karen Briggs (b. 1963) – violinist
Ruth Brown (1928–2006) – Grammy Award-winning singer and entertainer
Bebe Buell (b. 1953) – fashion model, famous groupie and mother of Liv Tyler
Mahlon Clark (1923–2007) – musician
LaTasha Colander (b. 1976) – track and field sprint star, 2000 Olympic gold medalist (4 × 400 m)
Jamin Elliott (b. 1979) – former NFL wide receiver for the Chicago Bears, New England Patriots and Atlanta Falcons
Missy Elliott (b. 1971) – rapper
Perry Ellis (1940–1986) – fashion designer
John Facenda (1913–1984) – WCAU news anchor from 1948 to 1973; known as the "Voice of NFL Films" until his death in 1984
Clifton C. Garvin (b. 1922) – President and CEO of Exxon
Chandler Harper (1914–2004) – golfer
Chad Hugo (b. 1974) – musician and producer in the Neptunes and N.E.R.D.
Ben L. Jones (b. 1941) – actor and politician
T. J. Jordan (b. 1986) – basketball player
LaShawn Merritt (b. 1986) – 2008 Olympic gold medal-winning sprinter
George "Shadow" Morton (b. 1944) – record producer and songwriter
Bismarck Myrick (b. 1940) – U.S. Ambassador to the Republic of Liberia, U.S. Ambassador to Lesotho
Tommy Newsom (1929–2007) – musician featured in Johnny Carson's The Tonight Show band with Doc Severinsen
Patton Oswalt (b. 1969) – comedian and television actor
Ace Parker (b. 1912) – Pro Football Hall of Fame quarterback; also played baseball with the Philadelphia Athletics
William Russ (b. 1950) – actor
Bill Schneider (b. 1944) – political commentator for CNN
Dorian Finney-Smith – basketball player for the University of Florida and Dallas Mavericks
Dorin Spivey – NBA World and NABA Lightweight Boxing Champion
Wanda Sykes (b. 1964) – actress, comedian, and comedy writer
Ted Thomas, Sr. (b. 1935) – Pentecostal preacher and pastor of the New Community Temple Church of God in Christ; General board member of the Church of God in Christ, Inc. denomination
Mike Watt (b. 1957) – musician, founding member and bassist of SST hardcore punk band Minutemen; current bassist for recently reunited 60s band The Stooges
Nicole Wray (b. 1980) – rapper and protégé of Missy Elliott

Suffolk
 James Avery (1955–2013) – actor best known for his portrayal of the patriarch and attorney (later judge) "Philip Banks", in the TV sitcom The Fresh Prince of Bel-Air 
Johnnie Barnes (b. 1968) – graduate of Hampton University; former football player for the San Diego Chargers and the Pittsburgh Steelers
Charlie Byrd (1925–1999) – jazz guitarist
Mills Edwin Godwin, Jr. (1914–1999) – two time Governor of Virginia
Lex Luger (b. 1991) – hip-hop music producer; produced tracks on Rick Ross's Teflon Don, Waka Flocka Flame's Flockaveli, Slim Thug's Tha Thug Show, and Kanye West and Jay-Z's Watch the Throne
Joe Maphis (1921–1986) – country music singer and songwriter
Terrence Warren (b. 1969) – former NFL player and All-American sprinter at Hampton University

Virginia Beach

 Corey Ashe (b. 1986), professional soccer player for the Houston Dynamo
 Wade Barrett (b. 1976), professional soccer player for the Houston Dynamo
 Felicia Barton, semi-finalist on American Idol
 Kharlton Belmar, professional soccer player for Portland Timbers 2
 Rudy Boesch, retired Navy SEAL and contestant on Survivor
 Jamelle Bouie, journalist, New York Times columnist, and political analyst
 Bill Bray, MLB player
 Jon Busch, Hampton Roads Mariner; Major League Soccer
 Curtis Bush, kickboxer
 Darren Caskey, Hampton Roads Mariner; Tottenham Hotspur; Reading
 Gabby Douglas, Olympic gymnastics gold medalist
 D.J. Dozier, football / baseball from Virginia Beach; Penn State All-American, first-round NFL draft 14th pick by Minnesota Vikings who was also drafted by major league baseball by the Detroit Tigers in the 18th round in 1983 (459th overall)
 Jason Dubois, MLB player
 Genesis the Greykid, artist, creative, poet, writer
 Percy Harvin, NFL player
 Michael Hearst, author, musician, and composer
 Angela Hucles, sports executive and former professional soccer player
 Daniel Hudson, MLB player
 Jay Hoffman, coached Hampton Roads Mariners; played professionally in the Canadian National Soccer League
 Bubba Jenkins, NCAA Division I wrestling national champion and MMA fighter
 Roy Lassiter, Hampton Roads Mariner; Major League Soccer; USA National Team
 B. J. Leiderman, composer of themes for NPR shows
 Marc Leishman, professional golfer
 Darin Lewis, Hampton Roads Mariner; MLS New York MetroStars
 EJ Manuel, NFL quarterback for the Oakland Raiders
 Evan Marriott, actor in Joe Millionaire
 Bob McDonnell, former Governor of Virginia
 Shane McFaul, Hampton Roads Mariner; Republic of Ireland U21
 Ryan McGinness, artist
 Darryl Monroe, professional basketball player, 2016 Israeli Basketball Premier League MVP
 Shawn Morimando, MLB player
 Guy Morgan, former NBA player
 Lenda Murray, IFBB professional bodybuilder
 Jamia Nash, singer, actress
 Juice Newton, singer, songwriter
 Derrick Nnadi, NFL defensive tackle
 Pusha T, rapper 
 David Robinson, 10x All-star, NBA MVP, 2x NBA Champion, 2x Olympic Gold medalist, Member of Naismith Memorial Basketball Hall of Fame, briefly grew up in Virginia Beach
 Neil Ramírez, MLB player
 J.R. Reid, NBA player
 Mark Reynolds, third baseman/first baseman for the Baltimore Orioles from Virginia Beach; drafted in 2004 by the Arizona Diamondbacks in the 16th round (476th overall)
 Pat Robertson, television preacher
 Aaron Rouse,  NFL Player
 Mark Ruffalo, Oscar-nominated actor; raised in Virginia Beach
 Todd Schnitt, radio personality
 Herbert Scott – Kellam High School, Virginia Union University, Dallas Cowboys offensive lineman in NFL for 10 seasons, 3× Pro Bowl, 2× First-team All-Pro, winner of Super Bowl XII
 Rhea Seehorn, actress known for role as Kim Wexler in Better Call Saul
 Julie Shiflet, professional tennis player
 Scott Sizemore, MLB player
 Chris Taylor, MLB player
 Ian Thomas, MLB player
 Shamarko Thomas – Pittsburgh Steelers safety and 111th pick overall in the 2013 NFL Draft; starred at Ocean Lakes High School in Virginia Beach
 Timbaland, music producer
 Lil Tracy, rapper, singer and songwriter
 Turnover, indie rock band
 Travis Wall, choreographer and contestant on So You Think You Can Dance 
 Elizabeth Williams, played college basketball at Duke University, WNBA player for Atlanta Dream 
 Matthew E. White, songwriter and producer
 Matt Williams, MLB player
 Pharrell Williams, rapper, singer, record producer, composer and fashion designer
 Glenn Yates Jr., architect snd Virginia state legislator
 Hunter Yeany, racing driver
 Glenn Youngkin, elected governor of Virginia in 2021
 Ryan Zimmerman, MLB player

Williamsburg
Jimmy Fortune (b. 1955) – vocalist with the Statler Brothers
Mel Gray (b. 1961) – professional football player and member of NFL all decade team of 1990s
Bruce Hornsby (b. 1954) – singer and songwriter
Linda Lavin (b. 1937) – actress
Seven Mary Three – alternative rock band
Canaan Smith (b. 1984) – country music artist
Ron Springs (b. 1956) – running back for the Dallas Cowboys and the Tampa Bay Buccaneers
Shawn Springs (b. 1975) – football player for the Washington Redskins
Lawrence Taylor (b. 1959) – former professional football player for the New York Giants; professional wrestler; member of the Pro Football Hall of Fame
George Wythe (1726–1806) – first professor of law at William and Mary; taught future presidents Thomas Jefferson and James Monroe, and future Chief Justice of the Supreme Court John Marshall; signer of the Declaration of Independence

York County
Terry Kirby (b. 1970) – professional football player for the Miami Dolphins and Oakland Raiders
Wayne Kirby (b. 1964) –  Major League Baseball player for the Los Angeles Dodgers and Cleveland Indians
Thomas Nelson, Jr. (1738–1789) – signer of the Declaration of Independence
Bryan Randall (b. 1983) – 2005 ACC Football Player of the Year
Chris Slade (b. 1971) – professional football player for the New England Patriots

References 

Hampton Roads
Hampton
Hampton Roads